Abbey Dowrick is an Australian rules footballer for Port Adelaide in the AFL Women's competition.

Dowrick played junior football for the Mines Rovers in the Goldfields Football League and was selected in the 2019 Western Australian under-18 team.

Dowrick's sister McKenzie Dowrick plays for the Adelaide Crows.

References

Port Adelaide Football Club (AFLW) players